Giovanni Battista Fagiuoli (24 June 1660 – 1742) was an Italian poet and dramatists, noted for his light and humorous works.

Biography
He was born in Florence. He was known as a comic and sarcastic wit in the Medici court and salons of the 18th century. He was said to be favored by the last of the Medici rulers as a low-brow, sometimes coarse, foil to the highly erudite scholars of Florence, or by some seen as a fitting "highlight" of a corrupt and He is said to have worked in the tradition of Francesco Berni (1497/1535). In a short prefix and biography to a collection of Motte, Facezie, e Burle dei celebre buffone di Corte (Witticisms, Jokes and Pranks of the Celebrated Court Jester, printed in 1891, It describes Fagiuoli's writings thus:Some of the jokes and witty sayings seemed to some to be more pleasant to court jesters than to a humorous and joking man. Sometimes jokes went beyond the limit; but the Prince enjoyed himself, ...laughing so as not to gnash his teeth...His satire was sometimes biting; more often sharp and cutting, seldom screeching or evil.

He was buried in the church of San Lorenzo.

References

1660 births
1742 deaths
18th-century Italian writers
18th-century Italian male writers
People from Florence